Momil is a town and municipality located in the Córdoba Department, northern Colombia.

References
 View complete information of Momil in Wikipedia in Spanish
 Momil official website

Municipalities of Córdoba Department